Chicco is a surname. Notable people with the surname include:

 (1907–1990), Italian chess composer
Davide Chicco (born 1973), Italian mountain runner
Francesco Chicco, Italian rower 
Ignacio Chicco (born 1996), Argentine footballer
Julián Chicco (born 1998), Argentine footballer, brother of Ignacio